"The Killing Jar" is a song written, produced and recorded by English rock band Siouxsie and the Banshees.  It was released in 1988 as the second single from the band's ninth studio album, Peepshow.

Music and reception
The song is an uptempo number which reflects the pop music direction Siouxsie and the Banshees were taking at the time. Still, the track contained alternative rock elements and the band's trademark cryptic lyrical content. According to Siouxsie, the song was inspired by a technique used by butterfly collectors to retain the beauty of the animals. "The Killing Jar" was remixed slightly for its radio version, most notably in the song's introduction and percussion throughout. The single version of "The Killing Jar" was featured on the Banshees' 1992 compilation Twice Upon a Time: The Singles.

Following the American success of their previous single, "Peek-a-Boo", which hit No 1 on the Billboard Modern Rock Tracks chart, "The Killing Jar" nearly matched the feat, peaking at No. 2. The single hit No. 41 on the UK Singles Chart.

In other media
"The Killing Jar" was also included in the soundtrack for the 2013 Canadian movie Haunter.

"The Killing Jar" was featured in the 2009 videogame Rock Band Unplugged for the Playstation Portable.

Charts

References 

1988 singles
Siouxsie and the Banshees songs
1988 songs
Polydor Records singles
Songs written by Siouxsie Sioux
Songs written by Budgie (musician)
Songs written by Steven Severin